La Discrète (The Discreet) is a 1990 French comedy-drama film directed by Christian Vincent. It won three César Awards: for Best First Feature Film, Best Writing and Best Female Newcomer. Set in Paris, it tells the story of an embittered old man who encourages a vain young protégé to seduce an apparently innocent girl as raw material for a novel.

Plot
Antoine, a egocentric would-be writer, is abruptly left by his latest girlfriend Solange for another man. Wounded in his pride, Antoine tells his troubles to the lonely Jean, an elderly publisher and bookseller. Jean proposes that Antoine should get his revenge on Solange by writing a book. He is to pick a woman at random, make her fall in love with him, and then leave her. At the same time, he will keep a detailed journal of the experience, which Jean will publish as a novel. Dubious at first, Antoine agrees to the plan if Jean will define each step he is to take. After putting an ad in the local bakery for a typist, in his favourite café he interviews the demure Catherine, who he finds unattractive. Jean convinces him that this very aspect will make her a good candidate and that he is to progress gently, keeping his distance to see what moves she will make.

When she says she goes swimming every week and invites him to join her, he ridicules the idea. When she suggests a boat trip on the Seine, he is appalled at her provincialism. Following a visit to the cinema together, where he sneers at the film, he takes her to an expensive restaurant. After a couple of large cocktails she says she will be his and, going back to her room, they make love. Antoine tries to go home, but the building is locked for the night. Back in bed with Catherine, she tells him about an affair with her previous employer's husband and how she used to earn extra money in a brothel catering for special tastes.

Feeling that he can no longer go on with the project, Antoine dumps his journal at Jean's office. Furious, Jean gets his revenge by handing it to Catherine as she leaves Paris to go and stay with her parents in the country. She is devastated by the treachery of both men, but has the strength of mind to write Antoine a dignified goodbye letter.

The film ends with Antoine sitting in his favourite café, writing away. An attractive young woman on her own is looking interestedly at him, but he is oblivious.

Cast
 Fabrice Luchini as Antoine
 Judith Henry as Catherine
 Maurice Garrel as Jean
 Marie Bunel as Solange
 François Toumarkine as Manu
 Brice Beaugier as Solange's friend
 Yvette Petit as Baker's wife
 Nicole Félix as Monique
 Olivier Achard as Customer
 Serge Riaboukine as Cafe waiter
 Katia Popova as Girl in cafe
 Amy Laviètes as Ewa
 Hélène Hardouin as Catherine's friend
 Maria Verdi as Woman in restaurant
 Pierre Gérald as Scientist
 Sophie Broustal as Girl in pink

Background
In the late 1980s, Christian Vincent did research on 18th century women's fashion. It was intended for a collective film project for which he was to direct a sketch. In the 18th century, women were wearing little patches, made of a piece of taffeta, to set off the paleness of their skin. Those fake moles, glued to the skin, were known as "mouches."

The project failed to materialize but it gave the filmmaker the idea for his first feature. The film title refers to the nickname that Antoine gives Catherine because of the mole on her chin. As he explains, in the 18th-century fashion code, such mole was called "discreet."

Production
Producer Alain Rocca founded his company, Les Productions Lazennec, as a workshop for young film-school graduates. The first feature film, Love without Pity, that Rocca produced in 1989, was a critical success, and won a César Award for Best First Feature Film. La Discrète was his second project, with the modest budget of 11.24 million francs ($2.2 million). The script was written by Christian Vincent who worked on it for more than a year with co-writer Jean-Pierre Ronssin. The writers were not paid for this work until the film was in production. The leading roles were given to relatively unknown actors: Fabrice Luchini and Judith Henry. The production went rather smoothly, and the film came in under budget. The actual cost was 10.46 million francs ($1.97 million).

Release
The film was released in France on November 21, 1990, sold 1.4 million tickets, and became the 20th most watched film of the year. It didn't do well at the U.S. box-office, where it earned only $100,000 in 1992, and failed to recover even its promotional costs.

Critical reception
The film received wide critical acclaim. The Los Angeles Times said: "Life is not a game, but "La Discrete" is: exquisite, humorous, touching, knowing, beautifully played. The characters may lose, but their audience won't." TV Guide called it "richly ironic, erotic, ephemeral, intellectually provocative and downright earthy," and added that it is "one of those deceptively small films that rocks the soul with its almost offhanded insights into eternal human truths. It's as good as Rohmer's best, with a lot less talk and a much harder edge." In Film Comment critic Molly Haskell named it her favorite film of the year. The Austin Chronicle called it "a wonderful, honest film", and said that Vincent's direction is "so self-assured it's hard to believe this is his first feature film." Time Out said it was a "very Rohmer-esque film", and commented that "the interest lies not so much in the predictable intrigue - it almost reads like a commonplace seduction comedy - as in the treatment of a particularly unpalatable strain of French amorous discourse."

Awards
1991 César Awards:

 Best First Feature Film (Christian Vincent) - Winner
 Best Writing (Christian Vincent, Jean-Pierre Ronssin) - Winner
 Best Female Newcomer (Judith Henry) - Winner
 Best Actor (Fabrice Luchini) - Nominee
 Best Supporting Actor (Maurice Garrel) - Nominee

1990: Prix Méliès

References

External links
 
 

French comedy-drama films
1990 films
Films directed by Christian Vincent
Best First Feature Film César Award winners
Films set in Paris
Films shot in Paris
1990 directorial debut films
1990s French-language films
1990s French films